Petr Mokrý (born April 8, 1948) is a Czechoslovak sprint canoer who competed in the early 1970s. He finished ninth in the C-2 1000 m event at the 1972 Summer Olympics in Munich.

References
Sports-reference.com profile

1948 births
Canoeists at the 1972 Summer Olympics
Czechoslovak male canoeists
Living people
Olympic canoeists of Czechoslovakia
Place of birth missing (living people)